The Swedish National Food Agency is a Swedish government agency that answers to the Ministry of Agriculture, Food and Consumer Affairs. The agency is located in Uppsala.

It is the central supervisory authority for matters relating to food and drinking water. It has the task of protecting consumer interest by working for safe food of good quality, fair practices in the food trade, and healthy eating habits.

See also
 Food Administration
Government agencies in Sweden

References

External links
Swedish National Food Administration - official site

Government agencies of Sweden
Regulation in Sweden
Food safety organizations